The Norwegian Horticultural Society (often shortened to Hageselskapet) is an interest organisation in Norway.

It was established as Selskabet Havedyrkningens Venner in 1884. Its purpose is to promote gardening interests. It issues the magazine Norsk Hagetidend. Chairman of the board is Ole Petter Vik, and the organizational headquarters are in Oslo. Queen Sonja of Norway has matronage over the society.

References

External links
Official site

Organizations established in 1884
Organisations based in Oslo
Clubs and societies in Norway